Thalassotalea atypica is a Gram-negative, strictly aerobic and non-spore-forming bacterium from the genus of Thalassotalea which has been isolated from seawater from Rizhao in China.

References

Alteromonadales
Bacteria described in 2018